Round 2 is the second studio album by American recording artist J. Holiday, it was released on March 10, 2009, by Music Line Group and Capitol Records. It is the follow-up to his debut album, Back of My Lac', which was released in 2007. This record would later be his final studio release with Capitol. The album was supported by the lone single, "It's Yours", which achieved moderate chart success.

Upon release, Round 2 received mixed reviews from music critics, who  complimented its production and songwriting and was considered to be an improvement from his previous album.

Singles
The first single "It's Yours", was released on December 16, 2008. The song had achieved minor chart success, debuting at number 25 on the US Hot R&B/Hip-Hop Songs and also debuting at number 33 on the Japan Hot 100 chart. A music video was released and directed by Jonathan Mannion.

The second single that was supposed to be released was Fall, but due to label problems it was canceled like "Come Here" on his previous album.

Commercial performance
The album sold 55,000 copies in its first week and debuted at number 4 on the Billboard 200. The album has sold 300,000 copies in the United States.

Critical reception

Round 2 received mixed reviews from music critics. Andy Kellman of AllMusic said, "Holiday instead delivers a second album that is not a retread. It's not a reinvention, either, but the roster of collaborators is almost completely different, and Holiday all but eliminates the tough guy and stoner talk." Mark Edward Nero of About.com said Round 2 is a well-sung, well-written, well-produced album, but the one negative is that it's a little bland and leans too much on love songs. Nathan Slavik of DJBooth stated that Round 2 finds Holiday shifting away from Lac’s harder-edged image in favor of a smoother sound, resulting in a well-crafted album that shows that while Holiday’s got a ways to go before he reaches elite status, no one will ever be able to call him a one-hit wonder again.

Track listing

Notes
  signifies an co-producer

Sample credits
 "Wrong Lover" contains interpolations from the composition "Hurry Up This way Again" written by Cynthia Biggs & Dexter Wansel.

Personnel
Credits for Round 2 adapted from Allmusic.

All-Star - Audio Production, Engineer, Producer
Karl Antoine - Composer
Luke Austin - Audio Production, Composer, Keyboards, Producer
Babbs - Composer
Chris Bellman - Mastering
Big Reese - Audio Production
Cynthia Biggs - Composer
Bowen - Composer
Ronette Bowie - A&R
David Brown - Composer, Vocal Arrangement
Cameron - Composer
Travis Cherry - Composer
Mike Chesser - Producer, Audio Production, Composer
Cmillions - Producer
Colapietro - Composer
Vito Colapietro - Composer
The Co-Stars - Audio Production
Chris Dave - Drums
Chris 'Daddy' Dave - Drums, Woodwind
Kevin "KD" Davis - Mixing
Neely Dinkins - Engineer
Neely Dinkins, Jr. - Composer
Nicole Frantz - Creative Director
Moses Gallart - Mixing Assistant
Adam Gibbs - Producer, Audio Production, Composer
Gordon - Composer
Green - Composer
Grymes - Composer
Reggie Hamlet - Producer
Reginald Hamlet - Audio Production, Composer
Chuck Harmony - Audio Production, Composer, Producer
J. Holiday - Arranger, Audio Production, Engineer, Executive Producer, Primary Artist, Producer, Vocals (Background)
Elizabeth Isik - A&R
Jasper - Arranger, Audio Production, Drum Programming, Keyboards, Vocals (Background)

Jaycen Joshua - Mixing
Jean - Composer
Mike Johnson - Engineer
Darius Jones - A&R
Kori Lewis - Stylist
Giancarlo Lino - Mixing Assistant
Carlton Lynn - Engineer
Erik Madrid - Mixing Assistant
Ankur Malhotra - A&R
Jonathan Mannion - Art Direction, Photography
Manny Marroquin - Mixing
McNair Jr. - Composer
Ne-Yo - Audio Production, Producer
Jon Ørom - Audio Production, Composer, Producer
David Oromaner - Composer
Dave Pensado - Mixing
Christian Plata - Mixing Assistant
The Platinum Brothers - Audio Production
Geno Regist - Engineer
Roberts - Composer
April Roomet - Stylist
Rick Ross - Featured Artist, Primary Artist
Scantlebury - Composer
Donnie Scantz - Arranger, Engineer, Keyboards, Programming
Smith - Composer
S. Smith - Composer
State of Emergency - Audio Production
Mark Stowbridge - Guitar
Mark Strowbridge - Guitar
James Thompson - Guitar (Bass)
Randy Urbanski - Mixing Assistant
Dexter Wansel - Composer
John Webb - Guitar (Bass)
John Webb - Guitar (Bass)
Wellington - Composer
Jules Wolfson - Audio Production, Composer, Producer
Wright - Composer
Andrew Wuepper - Mixing Assistant

Charts

References

External links

2009 albums
J. Holiday albums
Capitol Records albums
Albums produced by The-Dream
Albums produced by Ne-Yo